Shek Tong Tsui  is one of the 15 constituencies in the Central and Western District.

The constituency returns one district councillor to the Central and Western District Council, with an election every four years.

Shek Tong Tsui constituency is loosely based on the northwestern corner of Shek Tong Tsui with estimated population of 16,479.

Councillors represented

Election results

2010s

2000s

1990s

Notes

Citations

References
2011 District Council Election Results (Central & Western)
2007 District Council Election Results (Central & Western)
2003 District Council Election Results (Central & Western)
1999 District Council Election Results (Central & Western)
Szeto Wah on Chan's participation in the Provisional Legislative Council (Traditional Chinese

Constituencies of Hong Kong
Constituencies of Central and Western District Council
Shek Tong Tsui
Constituencies established in 1994
1994 establishments in Hong Kong